Feminin may refer to:
Feminin, an archaic name for Estrogen
Femininity